George Benjamin may refer to:

 George Benjamin (Orangeman) (1799–1864), Canadian political figure
 George Benjamin (composer) (born 1960), English composer
 George Benjamin, Jr. (1919–1944), American soldier who fought in the Philippines campaigns of 1944–1945, and received a posthumous Medal of Honor

See also
Georges C. Benjamin (born 1952), American public health official